Hey There Bomb is the a song and debut single by Melbourne rock music group, 67 Special, released in 2004.The song peaked at number 100 on the ARIA charts.

Track listing
 CD single (02180-2)
 "Hey There Bomb" – 3:40
 "Lost That" – 2:20
 "Last Drag" – 2:56
 "Princess Pie" – 2:57
 "Curious Mind" – 5:05

Charts

References

2004 debut singles
2004 singles